A disintegrin and metalloproteinase with thrombospondin motifs 2 (ADAM-TS2) also known as procollagen I N-proteinase (PC I-NP) is an enzyme that in humans is encoded by the ADAMTS2 gene.

Gene 

The ADAMTS2 gene is located on the long (q) arm of chromosome 5 at the end (terminus) of the arm, from base pair 178,473,473 to base pair 178,704,934.

Function 
ADAMTS2 is responsible for processing several types of procollagen proteins. Procollagens are the precursors of collagens, the proteins that add strength and support to many body tissues. Specifically, this enzyme clips a short chain of amino acids off one end of the procollagen. This clipping step is necessary for collagen molecules to function normally and assemble into fibrils outside cells.

Clinical significance 

Ehlers-Danlos syndrome, dermatosparaxis type is caused by mutations in the ADAMTS2 gene. Several mutations in the ADAMTS2 gene have been identified in people with this syndrome. These mutations greatly reduce the production of the enzyme made by the ADAMTS2 gene. Procollagen cannot be processed correctly without this enzyme. As a result, collagen fibrils are not assembled properly; they appear ribbon-like and disorganized under the microscope. Cross-links, or chemical interactions, between collagen fibrils are also affected. These defects weaken connective tissue (the tissue that binds and supports the body's muscles, ligaments, organs, and skin), which causes the signs and symptoms of the disorder.

See also
 ADAMTS5
 ADAMTS13

References

Further reading

External links
 GeneCard
 The MEROPS online database for peptidases and their inhibitors: M12.301
 

EC 3.4.24
ADAMTS